Wiley Interdisciplinary Reviews: Cognitive Science (WIREs Cognitive Science) is a bimonthly peer-reviewed scientific journal covering cognitive science. The journal was established in 2010 and is published by John Wiley & Sons as a member of its Wiley Interdisciplinary Reviews series. Submissions are by invitation only and focus on research areas at the interfaces of the traditional disciplines. Coverage aims to provide an encyclopedic coverage of the field. The journal does not publish original research papers, but "Editorial Commentaries", "Opinions", "Overviews" (broad and non-technical), "Advanced Reviews" (more typical review articles), and "Focus Articles" (specific real-world issues, examples, and implementations).

Editors-in-chief
The founding editor-in-chief was Lynn Nadel (University of Arizona), who was assisted by a number of associate editors. He was succeeded in 2017 by a group of 8 editors, one each for every section of the journal (with the exception of two editors for "Psychology"):

Abstracting and indexing
The journal is abstracted and indexed by:
Current Contents/Social & Behavioral Sciences
Index Medicus/MEDLINE/PubMed
PsycINFO
Scopus
Social Sciences Citation Index

According to the Journal Citation Reports, the journal has a 2020 impact factor of 3.476, ranking it 22nd out of 91 journals in the category "Psychology, Experimental".

Awards
The Wiley Interdisciplinary Reviews series received the 2009 R.R. Hawkins Award as well as PROSE Awards for "Excellence in Reference Works" and "eProduct/Best Multidiscipline Platform" from the "Professional & Scholarly Publishing Division" (PROSE) of the Association of American Publishers.

References

External links
 

Cognitive science journals
Wiley (publisher) academic journals
Bimonthly journals
Publications established in 2010
English-language journals